Massac is a census-designated place (CDP) in McCracken County, Kentucky, United States. The population was 4,505 at the 2010 census, an increase from 3,888 in 2000. It is part of the Paducah, KY-IL Micropolitan Statistical Area.

Geography
Massac is located at  (37.030066, -88.681369).

Demographics

As of the census of 2000, there were 3,888 people, 1,610 households, and 1,189 families residing in the CDP. The population density was 1,005.7/sq mi (387.9/km2). The racial makeup of the CDP was 94.80% White, 2.70% African American, 0.26% Native American, 0.85% Asian, 0.05% Pacific Islander, 0.23% from other races, and 1.11% from two or more races. Hispanic or Latino of any race were 1.26% of the population.

There were 1,610 households, out of which 34.4% had children under the age of 18 living with them, 60.5% were married couples living together, 10.7% had a female householder with no husband present, and 26.1% were non-families. 21.9% of all households were made up of individuals, and 7.0% had someone living alone who was 65 years of age or older. The average household size was 2.41 and the average family size was 2.81.

In the CDP, the population was spread out, with 24.6% under the age of 18, 8.3% from 18 to 24, 27.4% from 25 to 44, 27.0% from 45 to 64, and 12.7% who were 65 years of age or older. The median age was 39 years. For every 100 females, there were 91.1 males. For every 100 females age 18 and over, there were 86.3 males.

The median income for a household in the CDP was $46,201, and the median income for a family was $61,105. Males had a median income of $39,413 versus $25,240 for females. The per capita income for the CDP was $22,519. About 7.2% of families and 11.4% of the population were below the poverty line, including 20.2% of those under age 18 and 5.7% of those age 65 or over.

References

Census-designated places in McCracken County, Kentucky
Census-designated places in Kentucky
Paducah micropolitan area